Lorenzo Independent School District is a public school district based in Lorenzo, Texas (USA).

Located in Crosby County, a small portion of the district extends into Lubbock County.

Lorenzo ISD has two campuses –

Lorenzo High School (Grades 7-12 
Lorenzo Elementary School (Grades PK-6)

In 2009, the school district was rated "academically acceptable" by the Texas Education Agency.

Notable alumni
San Francisco 49ers quarterback Joe Reed attended Lorenzo High.

Special programs

Athletics
Lorenzo High School plays six-man football.

See also

List of school districts in Texas

References

External links
Lorenzo ISD

School districts in Crosby County, Texas
School districts in Lubbock County, Texas